Angellore is a French doom metal/gothic metal band. The name of the band comes from the title of the Tristania song "Angellore".

Biography
Rosarius and Walran first met through the internet in March 2007. In July 2007, during the Festival d'Avignon, they formed Angellore. Their first demo, Ambrosia, was written and recorded August 2007. Rosarius played the guitars and some of the keyboards and vocals, while Walran played the other half and imposed himself as a producer. Three songs were written in two days and put on MySpace. Through grabbing the attention of the Portuguese musician Marcos Marado, the band were part of a split CD with music project Merankorii, released in February 2009.

In the meantime, Angellore composed two more EPs, Les Promesses de l’Aube and Elégies aux Ames Perdues. In late 2009, drummer Ronnie, an old friend of Walran, joined the band, and later, in December 2009, the band entered the Studio AV to start recording their debut album. Errances was released in 2012 as a digital version and in 2013 as audio CD, earning good reviews.

In 2015 the band signs with Shunu Records, releasing the new album La Litanie des Cendres on August 21.

In late 2018, Angellore entered studio to record a new album. The new album will be titled "Rien Ne Devait Mourir" ("Nothing Had to Die"). It will be released by Shunu Records and Finisterian Dead End and on vinyl via The Vinyl Division in late 2019

Music
Angellore plays slow but melodic death/doom, combined with elements of gothic metal. Besides the usual instruments, they also use an acoustic guitar and a violin (played by session musician Catherine Arquez). The band makes use of three different vocal styles: clean-singing, baritone and death growls.

They are influenced by Draconian, Saturnus, Estatic Fear, Empyrium and Shape of Despair.

Discography

Demos
 Ambrosia (2007)

Albums
 Errances (2012)
 La Litanie des Cendres (2015)
 Rien Ne Devait Mourir (2020)

Compilation albums
 Premiéres Liturgies - Soupirs d'Aurore (2012)

EPs and splits
 Les Promesses de l’Aube (2008)
 Merankorii / Angellore (2009)
 Elégies aux Ames Perdues (2009)

Band members
 Rosarius - guitars, bass, keyboards, clean & harsh vocals (2007-)
 Walran - keyboards, clean & harsh vocals (2007-)
 Ronnie - drums (2009-)

References

External links 
 Angellore on Discoqs

French gothic metal musical groups
Doom metal musical groups